Swamp Thing is a platform video game for the NES and Game Boy. Based on the animated series of the same name, of the DC Comics superhero character Swamp Thing. It was published by THQ and released in December 1992.

A Swamp Thing title was also in development by Microsmiths for the Sega Mega Drive/Genesis but was canceled. It would have been published by NuVision Entertainment.

Gameplay
The NES version of Swamp Thing borrows the game engine from The Simpsons: Bart vs. the Space Mutants. Its introduction features the origin story of Swamp Thing and as depicted in the 1991 animated series. The player takes the role of the title character battling foes throughout the Louisiana swamps and other locations in a side-scrolling format. Swamp Thing's attack methods include punching and firing "sludge balls" which are acquired throughout the game. The player must venture through various stages, which include a graveyard, chemical factory, toxic dump, and finally, Arcane's lab. Bosses include Arcane's Un-Men, Dr. Deemo, Weedkiller, Skinman, and finally, Arcane himself.

In Game Boy's Swamp Thing, stages include the Arctic, the desert, and contaminated rainforests. Swamp Thing also uses tools like camouflage and thorn skin, and he must recycle scattered garbage in order to score points and gain additional powers.

Reception

Aside from marginal graphics, the NES Swamp Thing has received average to generally negative reviews for its high difficulty, poor music, and dull gameplay. While perhaps faring better than its NES counterpart, the Game Boy version of Swamp Thing was not met with high praise either, getting a 2.5/5 score from Nintendo Power.

Notes

References

1992 video games
Imagineering (company) games
Nintendo Entertainment System games
Game Boy games
Platform games
THQ games
Cancelled Sega Genesis games
Video games based on DC Comics
Swamp Thing in other media
Works by Len Wein
Video games scored by Mark Van Hecke
Video games set in Louisiana
Video games developed in the United States